Esperiana is a genus of freshwater snails with an operculum, aquatic gastropod mollusks in the family Melanopsidae.

Species
Species within the genus Esperiana include:
 Esperiana daudebartii
 Esperiana esperi

References

External links

Melanopsidae